"Ready to Let Go" is a song by American alternative rock band Cage the Elephant. It was produced by John Hill and was released as the lead single from the band's fifth studio album Social Cues on January 31, 2019. It reached number five on Billboard Alternative Songs chart in the United States.

Charts

Release history

References

2019 songs
2019 singles
Cage the Elephant songs
RCA Records singles
Songs written by Matt Shultz (singer)